is a bus company in the Meitetsu Group.

Bus Lines

Highway Buses 
Chuo Highway Bus
Meitetsu BC - Shinjuku
Meitetsu BC - Iida
Meitetsu BC - Ina, Komagane, Minowa
Meitetsu BC - Matsumoto
Meitetsu BC - Nagano
Meitetsu BC - Niigata
Hokuriku Expressway Bus
Meitetsu BC - Fukui
Meitetsu BC - Kanazawa
Tokai Hokuriku Expressway Bus
Meitetsu BC - Takayama
Meitetsu BC - Toyama
Meishin Highway Bus
Meitetsu BC - Kyoto Station
Meitetsu BC - Kobe
Others
Dontaku
Meitetsu BC - Kitakyushu, Fukuoka
Aoba
Meitetsu BC - Sendai
Nagoya - Aichi Gakuen University
Nagoya - Toyota
Nagoya - Komaki, Meiji-mura
Nagoya - Tajimi
Nagoya - Seki, Mino
Nagoya - Nagashima Spa Land (via Higashi Meihan Expressway)
Nagoya - Fuji-Q Highland, Lake Kawaguchi, Fujiyoshida (*Seasonal operation)
Nagoya - Nara
Sanuki Express
Meitetsu BC - Takamatsu, Marugame
Orange Liner
Meitetsu BC - Matsuyama, Yawatahama
Nagoya - Tokushima (*Seasonal operation)
Glover
Meitetsu BC - Nagasaki
Shiranui
Meitetsu BC - Kumamoto

See also 

 Gifu Bus

External links

Meitetesu Bus
Related Self Catering in Scotland
 

Meitetsu Group